Monosalpinx is a genus of flowering plants belonging to the family Rubiaceae.

Its native range is Western Tropical Africa.

Species:
 Monosalpinx guillaumetii N.Hallé

References

Rubiaceae
Rubiaceae genera